The PHL-81 is a truck-mounted self-propelled 122 mm multiple rocket launcher (SPMRL) produced by the People's Republic of China for the People's Liberation Army Ground Force.

The PHL-81 is being replaced by the modernised version PHL-11.

Design and development 

It is a variant of the Soviet BM-21 Grad. The Type 81 was the first in a family of Chinese self-propelled 122 mm rocket launchers.

The system forms the backbone of People's Liberation Army Ground Force's combined arms brigade. Type 81 went through different iterations of modernization to improve the combat effectiveness.

The spin-stabilized rocket fired by the Type 81 may be armed with a high explosive warhead or a steel fragmentation warhead.

Variants 
Type 81 Designation: PHL-81. The Type 81 mounts a 40-round launcher on an Hongyan CQ261 6X6 truck chassis. The truck was later changed to a Shaanxi SX250 in 1975.
Type 83 Improved variant of Type 81. The Type 83 mounts a 24-round launcher on a 6x6 truck chassis.
Type 89 Designation PHZ-89. This is an improved variant of the original Type 81 MRL system. It was adopted by the PLA in 1989. The Type 89 mounts a new type of 40-round box launcher on the armored tracked chassis of the Type 83 self-propelled gun. The rockets may be fired in 20 seconds. The launcher is mounted at the rear with a reload pack in front.
Type 90 Designation PHL-90. The Type 90 shares the 40-round launcher with PHZ-89, but the rockets are mounted on a Tiema SC2030 6X6 truck. The truck also carries a reload pack of 40 additional rockets; the launcher to be reloaded within 3 minutes.
Type 90A Designation PHL-90A. The Type 90A is an upgrade of the Type 90. The 40-round launcher is mounted on a Tiema XC2200 6×6 truck, has improved fire control, and a battery may be remotely controlled by a command vehicle. It is manufactured by Norinco.
Type 90B The Type 90B is an upgrade of the Type 90A. The 40-round launchers are mounted on a Beifang Benchi 2629 6×6 trucks. The system adds WZ551 reconnaissance vehicles, and the command vehicle has improved command and fire control systems.

Operators

 Chadian Ground Forces - 5 units in service as of 2021

 People's Liberation Army Ground Force - 550 units of PHL-81/PHL-90; 350 unit of PHL-11; 375 units of PHZ-89; 700 units of PHL-81 in storage.

Gabonese Army - 4 units of Type 90 were delivered in 2004

Ghana Army - 3 units in service as of 2021

Indonesian Marine Corps - At least 4 units of Type 90b purchased in 2015

Myanmar Army - 20 units of Type-81 and 20 units of Type-90

Namibian Army- at least 2 Units have been observed in public appearances.

Peruvian Army - 24 units of Type 90B purchased in January 2014

See also 
PHL-03: Chinese truck-mounted 300 mm multiple rocket launcher.
PHL-16: Chinese truck-mounted 370 mm multiple rocket launcher.

References

External links 
 Technical data of the Type 81 SPRL

Self-propelled artillery of the People's Republic of China
122 mm artillery
Self-propelled rocket launchers
Multiple rocket launchers
Military vehicles introduced in the 1980s